Khánh Sơn is a rural district (huyện) of Khánh Hòa province in the South Central Coast region of Vietnam. As of 2003 the district had a population of 18,368. The district covers an area of 337 km². The district capital lies at Tô Hạp.

References

Districts of Khánh Hòa province